Luca Sbisa (born 30 January 1990) is an Italian-born Swiss former professional ice hockey defenceman. He is currently a development coach for the San Jose Sharks. He played for the Philadelphia Flyers, Anaheim Ducks, Vancouver Canucks, Vegas Golden Knights, New York Islanders Winnipeg Jets and Nashville Predators. Sbisa played major junior hockey in Canada with the Lethbridge Hurricanes and Portland Winterhawks of the Western Hockey League (WHL) before being selected by the Flyers in the first round of the 2008 NHL Entry Draft. He made his NHL debut that year before returning to Lethbridge.

Sbisa has also played for Switzerland in multiple international tournaments, including several International Ice Hockey Federation (IIHF) Ice Hockey World Championships as well as the 2010 Winter Olympics.

Playing career
Sbisa was drafted 19th overall by the Philadelphia Flyers at the 2008 NHL Entry Draft. On 1 October 2008, Sbisa signed a three-year, entry-level contract with the Flyers. Prior to his entry into the NHL, Sbisa started his hockey career with EV Zug in Switzerland. In the 2006–07 season, he made his debut for that club in the Swiss National League A (NLA). Later, he played with the EHC Seewen in the Swiss Liga. In the summer of 2007, he was drafted in the Canadian Hockey League (CHL)'s annual import draft to the Lethbridge Hurricanes of the Western Hockey League (WHL).

Sbisa joined the Flyers for the start of the 2008–09 season, playing 39 games before being returned to the Hurricanes to complete the season. He returned to the Flyers to play in the 2009 Stanley Cup playoffs. He replaced Daniel Carcillo on a line when Carcillo was suspended for taking a hit on the Pittsburgh Penguins' forward Maxime Talbot during Game 1 of the Eastern Conference Quarter-finals. He was widely regarded as one of the Flyers' top prospects during his tenure in Philadelphia.

At the 2009 NHL Entry Draft, on 26 June 2009, Sbisa was traded, along with Joffrey Lupul and Philadelphia's 2009 and 2010 first-round picks, to the Anaheim Ducks in exchange for Chris Pronger and Ryan Dingle.

On 16 October 2010, the Ducks sent Sbisa down to their American Hockey League (AHL) affiliate, the Syracuse Crunch, later recalling him on 10 November. Later in the 2010–11 season, on 8 March 2011, Sbisa signed a four-year contract extension with the Ducks, worth $8.7 million with a yearly cap hit of $2.175 million.

On 27 June 2014, Sbisa was traded to the Vancouver Canucks, along with teammate Nick Bonino and a first- and third-round pick in 2014, in exchange for Ryan Kesler and a third-round pick in 2015. On 8 April 2015, the Canucks signed Sbisa to a three-year extension worth $10.8 million.

On 21 June 2017, having been left exposed by the Canucks, Sbisa was selected by the Vegas Golden Knights in the 2017 NHL Expansion Draft.

During the 2018 off-season, after not being re-signed by the Golden Knights, Sbisa was invited to the New York Islanders training camp on a professional try out contract. He later signed a one-year contract with the Islanders on 24 September 2018.

On 22 October 2019, Sbisa signed a one-year, $750,000 contract to return to the Ducks. The team immediately placed him on waivers, where he was claimed by the Winnipeg Jets on 23 October. Later, on 21 November 2019, Sbisa scored his first goal as a Winnipeg Jet (which was his first goal since he was still a member of the Vegas Golden Knights in the 2017–18 season) in a 5-3 road loss to the Dallas Stars. In the 2019–20 season, Sbisa made 44 appearances with the Jets, posting 2 goals and 10 points.

On 9 October 2020, Sbisa was signed by the Jets to a one-year, $800,000 contract extension. After attending the Jets training camp in preparation for the delayed 2020–21 season, Sbisa was placed on waivers by Winnipeg and subsequently claimed by the Nashville Predators on 12 January 2021.

International play

Sbisa played for Switzerland in the 2010 Winter Olympics, where the Swiss finished in eighth place.

Personal life
Sbisa was born in Ozieri, a city on the island of Sardinia, Italy, the first son and second child of Massimo and Isabella Sbisa. He has a sister, Chiara, who is two years older. The Sbisa family moved to Oberägeri, Switzerland, when he was one. At the age of three, his parents took him to a game of EV Zug which made him want to become a hockey player. Sbisa speaks four languages: English, German, Italian and French. On 9 July 2016, Sbisa married long-time girlfriend, Lauren Anaka Sbisa. The two met while he was competing at the 2010 Winter Olympics in Vancouver. In August 2016 they reached the summit of Mount Kilimanjaro in Africa, citing this as a major dream and personal achievement for the pair. On 16 June 2017, Sbisa and his wife had their first child.

Career statistics

Regular season and playoffs

International

References

External links
 

1990 births
Anaheim Ducks players
EV Zug players
Ice hockey players at the 2010 Winter Olympics
Italian ice hockey players
Lethbridge Hurricanes players
Living people
Nashville Predators players
National Hockey League first-round draft picks
New York Islanders players
Norfolk Admirals players
Olympic ice hockey players of Switzerland
People from Ozieri
Philadelphia Flyers draft picks
Philadelphia Flyers players
Philadelphia Phantoms players
Portland Winterhawks players
Swiss ice hockey defencemen
Swiss expatriate sportspeople in Canada
Swiss expatriate sportspeople in the United States
Syracuse Crunch players
Vancouver Canucks players
Vegas Golden Knights players
Winnipeg Jets players
Sportspeople from Sardinia
Swiss expatriate ice hockey people
Expatriate ice hockey players in the United States
Expatriate ice hockey players in Canada
Sportspeople from the canton of Zug
Italian emigrants to Switzerland